Emmanuel Macron, les coulisses d'une victoire is a 2017 French-language documentary film directed by Yann L'Hénoret. It is about Emmanuel Macron's successful bid in the French presidential election. It was first shown on TF1 on 8 May 2017, when it was watched by 4.4 million viewers.

References

External links
Emmanuel Macron, les coulisses d'une victoire on the La Chaîne Info website

2017 television films
2017 films
2017 documentary films
Documentary films about politicians
2010s French-language films
Macron family
Documentary films about elections
2017 French presidential election
French documentary television films
2010s French films